Millericrinida is an order of articulate crinoids that originated in the Anisian (Middle Triassic).

References

 
Articulata (Crinoidea)
Anisian first appearances
Extant Middle Triassic first appearances
Prehistoric animal orders
Echinoderm orders